My Binondo Girl is a 2011 Philippine romantic comedy television drama. It is set to premiere from August 22, 2011 to January 20, 2012 replacing Minsan Lang Kita Iibigin on ABS-CBN's Primetime Bida evening block. The drama revolves around a girl who pretends to be a man to gain her father's affection.

Synopsis

My Binondo Girl is the story of Jade Dimaguiba, a girl who spent her life seeking the approval and acceptance of her Chinese father Chen Sy (Richard Yap), who attempted to put her up for adoption when she was young because of China's One Child Policy (wherein couples either put their first child up for adoption or pay a government fine to have a second child).

His decision was swiftly made after learning that his Filipina wife Zeny (Ai Ai delas Alas) is pregnant with a baby boy, which is more favored under the Chinese tradition. In order to protect her child, Zeny returns to the Philippines only to suffer a miscarriage and lose the second child.

Years after, Chen Sy, already a successful business tycoon, finds Zeny to see Yuan, the baby boy. Zeny refuses to tell him his whereabouts but despite this, Chen continues to ignore Jade and disregard her as his daughter. Jade vows to gain her father's acceptance someday and graduates with top honors to prove to her father that despite her gender, she is a worthy daughter.

However, in an unexpected turn of events, Chen loses his other son Chen Sy II (from his second marriage) to an accident and Jade is forced to pose as Yuan in order to get her mother and grandmother Amor (Gina Pareño) out of jail because of Jean (Cherry Pie Picache), the second wife's machinations.  Jade is helped through her journey by Onyx (Jolo Revilla), her childhood friend and determined suitor; Trevor (Matteo Guidicelli), the happy go lucky stepson of her father's business partner; and Andy (Xian Lim), who started off as her competition but ended up as one of her staunchest supporters upon learning her dual identity.

Cast and characters

Main cast
 Kim Chiu as Jadelyn "Jade" Dimaguiba- Sy -Wu / Yuan Sy 
 Xian Lim as Andy Wu
 Jolo Revilla as Onyx Dimalanta†
 Matteo Guidicelli as Trevor Wu

Supporting cast
 Maja Salvador as Amber Dionisio†
 Ai-Ai delas Alas as Zenaida "Zheny" Dimaguiba-Sy
 Gina Pareño as Amorsola "Amor" Dimaguiba
 Cherry Pie Picache as Jeanette "Jean" Dimasupil
 Glydel Mercado as Luningning "Ningning" Wu†
 Ricardo Cepeda as Edison Wu 
 Richard Yap as Chen Sy
 Marina Benipayo as Menchu Wu
 Laureen Uy as Amethyst Sy

Extended cast
 Simon Ibarra as Arturo Dimalanta
 Gilleth Sandico as Stella Dimalanta 
 Coleen Garcia as Marissa
 Eda Nolan as Annie
 David Chua as Stephen 
 Bea Saw as Althea
 Moi Marcampo as Anikka Cruz

Guest cast
 Quintin Alianza as Young Stephen
 Maurice Mabutas as Young Annie
 Aiko Climaco as Lena
 Gwen Garci as Lorraine
 Raymund Concepcion as College Dean
 George Lim as Arturo and Onyx's Boss
 Janvier Daily as Rafael Bautista
 Ian Valdez as Parlorista
 John Medina as Gieneth
 Rayver Cruz as Young Edison
 Aze Sasaki as Patrice
 Peter Chua as Wo Shu Master

Special participation
 Robi Domingo as Chen Sy II†
 Catherine Kiok Lay as Teacher
 Mutya Orquia as  young Jade Dimaguiba
 Sharlene San Pedro as preteen Amethyst Sy
 Izzy Canillo as young Onyx
 Kristoff Meneses as young Andy
 Joshen Bernardo as young Trevor

Production
The cast was announced during a press conference on April 7, 2011. In the story conference held by the network, it was stated that Kim Chiu would topbill the series together with Cherry Pie Picache, Glydel Mercado, and Ai Ai delas Alas. Three leading men were chosen for the series which included 
Jolo Revilla, Matteo Guidicelli, and Xian Lim. Filming started in April 2011 in Binondo, Manila and Hong Kong.

Awards and nominations

International release

Awards

See also
List of programs broadcast by ABS-CBN
List of ABS-CBN drama series

References

External links

ABS-CBN drama series
Philippine teen drama television series
2011 Philippine television series debuts
2012 Philippine television series endings
Philippine romantic comedy television series
Television series by Dreamscape Entertainment Television
Filipino-language television shows
Television shows set in China
Television shows set in Manila
Television shows set in Hong Kong